This page compares the sovereign states of Europe on economic, financial and social indicators.

Definition of Europe 
For the purposes of comparison the broader definition of Europe will be used. A sovereign state must meet at least one of the following criteria to be included:
 Be a recognised European state by the United Nations geoscheme for Europe
 Be a member state of the European Union
 Be a member state of the Eurozone
 Be a member state of the Council of Europe

Economic

Countries by GDP (nominal) 

Data provided is by the International Monetary Fund (2021)

GDP growth rate 

The real GDP growth rates provided are the 2015 estimates (unless otherwise indicated) as recorded in the CIA World Factbook.

GDP (nominal) per capita of sovereign states in Europe

Data provided is by the World Bank (2021). Data for Monaco and Liechtenstein is from 2020 and 2019 respectively.

GDP purchasing power parity (PPP) 

Data provided is by the International Monetary Fund (2018)

Net national wealth

European countries by total wealth

Financial

Current account balance 
The current account balance values provided are the 2013 figures (unless otherwise indicated) as recorded in the CIA World Factbook. Figures for Andorra, Liechtenstein, Monaco and San Marino are unavailable.

Public debt 
The public debt values provided are the 2013 figures (unless otherwise indicated) as recorded in the CIA World Factbook. Figures for Liechtenstein and Monaco are unavailable.

Unemployment rate 
The unemployment rate values provided are the most recent figures provided by varying sources, namely data released by governments.

Average wage 

The average wage values provided are 2018 figures (unless otherwise stated) as recorded by varying sources, namely releases by respective Governments. The values are for monthly average wage (annual wage divided by 12 months) for net income (after taxes) in Euro currency.

Minimum wage 

The minimum wage figures provided are the 2018 figures by The Federation of International Employers. Currency conversions from non-Euro currencies being based on the exchange rates of 2018.

Social

Human Development Index 
The Human Development Index values provided are the 2018 estimates for 2017, as included in the United Nations Development Programme's Human Development Report.

Percentage living below poverty line 
The percentage figures for citizens living below the poverty line are provided by either the CIA World Factbook (2007) or the World Bank (2012)  There is no data available for eleven European states.

Social Progress Index 
The Social Progress Index figures are provided by the nonprofit Social Progress Imperative and represent 2014. Eight European states are not represented as data is not available.

Opportunity 
The Opportunity figures are included in the 2014 Social Progress Index by the nonprofit Social Progress Imperative. Eight European states are not represented as data is not available.

World Happiness Report 
The World Happiness Report is a measure of happiness published by the United Nations Sustainable Development Solutions Network, with the figures provided being the 2013 edition for the 2010 to 2012 period.

Summary

Economic 
  Azerbaijan is the second fastest growing economy in Europe, and the fastest growing transcontinental economy
  is the weakest growing economy in Europe, the European Union, the Eurozone and the European members of the Commonwealth of Nations
  has the highest Net National Wealth of any European state
  is the current largest economy in Europe, the European Union and the Eurozone, with Germany remaining the Eurozone's largest economy
  is the fastest growing economy in both the Eurozone and the European Union
  is home to the highest GDP (nominal) per capita in both the European Union and Eurozone
  is the smallest economy in the Eurozone as well as the European Union, and is the fastest growing European economy in the Commonwealth of Nations
  is the fastest growing economy in Europe, but is also one of Europe's poorest countries, with the lowest GDP (nominal) per capita of any European state
  has the highest GDP (nominal) per capita of any European state
  is the largest transcontinental European economy and will remain so until at least 2030
  is Europe's smallest economy, and is also the third weakest growing economy in Europe
  is the largest non Eurozone economy in Europe.

Financial 
  has the lowest unemployment rate in the European Union and the Eurozone
  has the lowest unemployment rate in Europe, although this figure includes underemployment
  has the smallest average wage and monthly minimum wage in the European Union
  has the smallest public debt (as a percentage of GDP) of any state in Europe, as well as in the European Union and Eurozone
  has the largest financial deficit of any state in the Eurozone
  has the lowest monthly minimum wage in Europe
  has the largest financial surplus of any country in Europe as well as the remainder of the world
  has the highest public debt (as a percentage of GDP) of any European state, as well as having the largest unemployment rate in the European Union and Eurozone
  has the highest unemployment rate of any European state
  has the highest average wage of any state in Europe
  has the smallest average wage and monthly minimum wage in the Eurozone
  has the highest average wage in the European Union and Eurozone as well as the highest monthly minimum wage in the entirety of Europe
  has the largest surplus of those European countries not a member of either (or both) the EU or Eurozone
  has the smallest average wage in Europe, mostly as a result of ongoing political and military struggles
  has the largest deficit of any country in Europe and the European Union

Social 

  has the largest percentage living under the poverty line of any state in Europe

  has the highest Change in Happiness of any state in Europe
  has the smallest rating for Opportunity in Europe
  has the smallest rating for Opportunity in the European Union
  ranks highest on the World Happiness Report in Europe and the European Union
  has the largest percentage living under the poverty line in the Eurozone, and is also ranked last on the Social Progress Index among Eurozone members, including for Opportunity
  has the highest rating for Opportunity in Europe, the European Union and the Eurozone
  has the weakest Human Development Index and World Happiness Index figures in the Eurozone
  has the smallest percentage living below the poverty line in Europe
  ranks lowest on the Human Development Index and Social Progress Index in Europe
  has highest Human Development Index figure in the European Union and the Eurozone, and also ranks first in the EU and Eurozone on the Social Progress Index, as well as being the highest ranked country in the Eurozone on the World Happiness Index
  has the highest Human Development Index figure in Europe
  ranks highest in Europe on the Social Progress Index

Notes

References 

Financial And Social Rankings
Europe By Financial And Social Rankings